The Sears Tower—Harvard Observatory is a historic astronomical observatory that is part of Harvard Observatory and is located at 60 Garden Street in Cambridge, Massachusetts.  Now just a portion of the observatory's Building A, the Sears Tower is the oldest portion of the complex, designed by Isaiah Rogers and constructed in 1843.  This structure is a square brick building, with a projecting cornice and a Greek Revival entrance framed by pilasters.  The dome was equipped with a 15-inch telescope, the state of the art at the time.

The tower was listed on the National Register of Historic Places in 1987.

See also
List of astronomical observatories
National Register of Historic Places listings in Cambridge, Massachusetts

References

Towers completed in 1843
Harvard University buildings
Towers in Massachusetts
Astronomical observatories in Massachusetts
University and college buildings on the National Register of Historic Places in Massachusetts
National Register of Historic Places in Cambridge, Massachusetts
1843 establishments in Massachusetts